Adrianne Janette Byrd (born November 23, 1970- October 30, 2020) was a best-selling African-American author of more than 50 romance novels. Her most widely held book, The Beautiful Ones, is in  more than 400 WorldCat libraries.

Biography
Byrd was born in Memphis, Tennessee, into a military family. She traveled throughout Europe as a child. Byrd's older brother introduced her to romance novels when she was thirteen years of age, and she developed an interest in fiction writing.

Career
In 1994, a co-worker introduced Byrd to an article on the Romance Writers of America. By 1996, she sold her first novel, Defenseless, to Kensington Publishing. In 2006, she co-wrote the Hoodwives trilogy under the name De'nesha Diamond. Subsequently, she has written the bestselling (Hood) Divas series.

National publications, including Today’s Black Woman, Upscale, and Heart and Soul have featured her work. She has won local awards for screenwriting as well. 

In 2014, Byrd lives in Georgia, USA. She writes as De’nesha Diamond for the Hoodwives and Divas series. She has also written as Layla Jordan and A.J. Byrd.

Novels 
Measure of Man is a romantic comedy about a woman, Peyton Garner, who believes that her gay brother, Flex Adams, has found a new lover, Trey "Lincoln" Carver, after ending a ten-year relationship. Lincoln, however, is neither gay nor aware of who Flex is. When Peyton and Lincoln meet in New York, a relationship between the two develops. As Peyton's family gathers for a wedding, these misunderstandings begin to unfold.

My Destiny is romance novel about a woman named Destiny who has a distaste for her new neighbor, an attorney named Miles Stafford, who moved into the apartment across the hall. While Destiny observes his cocky behavior and his liking for women, she ultimately turns down his interest in her. However, when a power outage disrupts both of their lives, they are soon brought together and Destiny quickly realizes that she may have judged Miles too quickly. After becoming friends, they open their own law practice together. As they grow older, both Destiny and Miles seek out other romantic interests, but both can't seem to find the right person. Ten years past and Destiny finds Miles while she is intoxicated and shows a renewed interest in her previous lover.

Awards

RT Awards

RT Awards are awarded by Romantic Times Magazine

 2003 Comfort of A Man- Best Multicultural
 2010 Heart’s Secret-Best Multicultural
 2011-A Christmas Affair- Best Kimani Romance

Emma Awards,  awarded by Romance Slam Jam organization

2003- Comfort of a Man- Favorite Traditional Romance
2012- King’s Passion- Best Romance Sequel

Romance in Color Reader’s Choice Awards

 2003- Comfort of a Man- Favorite Book
 2003- Comfort of a Man- Favorite Hero
 2003- Comfort of a Man- Favorite Heroine.

Shade’s of Romance

 2003- Comfort of a Man-Best Arabesque romance.

Bibliography:

 Defenseless (1997) Kensington/ Pinnacle.
 Man of the House-One in a Million (1998) Kensington/Pinnacle.
 Forget Me Not (1998) Kensington/ Pinnacle.
 I Promise (1999) Kensington/ Pinnacle
 Say You Love Me (2000) BET/ Arabesque.
 Love’s Deception (2000) BET/ Arabesque.
 All I’ve Ever Wanted (2001) BET/ Arabesque.
 Surrender to Love (2002) BET/Arabesque.
 My Destiny (2003) BET/Arabesque
 Comfort of a Man (2003) BET/Arabesque
 Unforgettable (2004) BET/Arabesque
 If You Dare (2004)-Avon HarperCollins
 Measure of a Man (2005) BET/Arabesque
 The Beautiful Ones (2005) BET/ Arabesque
 Deadly Double (2005) BET/Arabesque
 Season of Miracle (2005) BET/Arabesque
 When You Were Mine (2006) BET/Arabesque
 She’s My Baby (2006) Harlequin/ Kimani
 Takin’ Chances for the Holidays-Finding the Right Key (2006)
 Harlequin/ Arabesque
 When Valentine’s Collide-(2007) Harlequin/ Kimani
 Blue Skies (2007) Harlequin/ Arabesque
 Feel the Fire (2007) Harlequin/ Arabesque
 To Love A Stranger (2007) Harlequin/ Arabesque
 Two Grooms and a Wedding ( 2008) Harlequin/ Kimani
 Controversy (2008) Harlequin/ Arabesque
 Her Lover’s Legacy (2008) Harlequin/ Kimani
 Sinful Chocolate (2009) Harlequin/ Kimani
 Love Takes Time (2009) Harlequin/ Arabesque
 Queen of Hearts (2009) Harlequin/ Arabesque
 Tender to his Touch (2009) Harlequin/ Arabesque
 Body Heat (2010) Harlequin/ Kimani
 Lover’s Premiere (2010) Harlequin/ Kimani
 Once Upon a Holiday-Candy Christmas ( 2010) Harlequin/
 Arabesque
 My Only Desire (2011) Harlequin/ Kimani
 King’s Passion (2011)-Harlequin/ Arabesque
 King’s Promise (2011)- Harlequin/ Arabesque
 King’s Pleasure (2011) Harlequin/ Arabesque
 A Christmas Affair (2011) Harlequin/ Kimani

As Denesha Diamond

 Desperate Hoodwives ( 2008) Simon and Schuster/ Touchtone
 Shameless Hoodwives (2008) Simon and Schuster/ Touchtone
 The Hood Life (2009) Simon and Schuster/ Touchtone
 Heartbreaker ( 2010) Kensington/ Dafina
 Hustlin’ Divas (2010) Kensington/ Dafina
 Street Divas (2011) Kensington/ Dafina
 Gangsta Divas ( 2012) Kensington/ Dafina
 Boss Divas (2013) Kensington/ Dafina

As Layla Jordan

 The Liar’s Club (2010) Kensington/ Dafina

As A.J. Byrd

Chasing Romeo (2009) Harlequin/ Kimani Tru
Losing Romeo (2010) Harlequin/ Kimani Tru According to WorldCat, the book is held in 274  libraries

References

External links
http://www.fantasticfiction.co.uk/b/adrianne-byrd/
http://www.harlequin.com/author.html?authorid=1236

American women novelists
African-American novelists
1970 births
Living people
20th-century American novelists
20th-century American women writers
21st-century American novelists
21st-century American women writers
Writers from Memphis, Tennessee
Novelists from Tennessee
20th-century African-American women writers
20th-century African-American writers
21st-century African-American women writers
21st-century African-American writers